Muhammad bin Yahya al-Ninowy (born 1970) is a Syrian-born American Islamic scholar, theologian, and medical doctor. He has been listed among The 500 Most Influential Muslims in a publication compiled by the Royal Islamic Strategic Studies Centre in Amman, Jordan.

Background
Al-Ninowy was born in Aleppo, Syria. His lineage is supposedly tracing back to the Islamic Prophet Muhammad, His great grandfather Ibrahim al-Mujab was buried, then to city of Mosul in the northern Iraqi province of Ninowa, then to Aleppo in northern Syria a few hundred years ago.

Education
Al-Ninowy began his study under his father, As-Sayyed Yahya ibn Muhammad, and many of the scholars in Aleppo memorising the Qur'an and acquiring knowledge in Islamic sciences, including Aqidah (Islamic theology), Fiqh (Islamic jurisprudence), Hadith (Prophetic tradition) and Ihsan (Sufism), with ijazah's (certificate to teach). He particularly specializes in the fields of Hadith, Tawhid, and Tazkiyyah/Ihsan.

He attended Al-Azhar University, Faculty of Usool ud-Deen, where he studied under many scholars. He got his PhD in Hadith sciences. He also travelled to seek knowledge under many scholars who resided in Syria, Madina, Mecca, Morocco, Egypt, Sudan, Jordan and more.

Career
Al-Ninowy is the Founding Director of Madina Institute, Madina Seminary, and Planet Mercy, with campuses in the United States, the United Kingdom, Canada, South Africa, Norway, Sudan, and Malaysia.

Through the Madina Institutes and Seminaries, Al-Ninowy is offering Islamic Studies Degree programs geared toward educating Imams and Theological Scholars. Al-Ninowy is considered to be a Muhaddith – a scholar of Hadith sciences.

He has authored books in theology, hadith, usul, and Sufi sciences. He has been a pioneer working at grass-root levels, to centralize "unconditional compassion and love" as the main themes of religion, and has been the forerunner in promoting non-violence among all people and religions, worldwide. He is the author of Non-violence: a Fundamental Islamic Principle, and established a school for Non-violence and Peace Studies based on Islamic Principles.

Al-Ninowy is also a spiritual guide and heads a worldwide Shadhili Sufi order under the Alawi-Husayni-Ninowi Zawiyah. In addition to a PhD in Islamic Studies, Al-Ninowy also holds a bachelor's degree in Microbiology from the University of Illinois, and a Doctor of Medicine degree.

Since 2001, al-Ninowy was the Imam and Khateeb of Al-Madina Institute and Masjid located in Norcross, Atlanta, Georgia, United States, where he delivered the weekly khutbah (Friday sermon) and gave a weekly majlis (religious gathering) in Hadith and Tawheed. He moved to establish Madina Institute in Duluth in Atlanta, Georgia where he has been since 2011. He participates in conferences on Islam, world peace, and welfare of humanity.

Al-Ninowy is a professor of theology and was a professor of Physiology and Anatomy at the University system of Georgia.

He has also written on many topics, albeit most of his writing is in Arabic and not yet in print. He has written the forward to a number of books as well as producing his own works in English, including Expressing Delight in the Birth of the Light and The Book of Love.

Center for Nonviolence and Peace Studies 
The Center for Non-violence and Peace Studies is an integral part of Madina Institute, a premier destination for Islamic education in which Muslims from all backgrounds can engage traditional Islamic teachings in a healthy and tolerant environment. The primary goal of the Center for Nonviolence and Peace Studies is to continue the Madinan School of Non-violence and Peace as laid down in the Prophetic example, and to challenge global extremism, in both its violent and non-violent forms. Madina Institute's center for Non-violence and Peace Studies offers diploma's and degree programs in non-violence.

Personal life
Al-Ninowy lives with his family in Atlanta, Georgia, United States. He is married, and has three sons and a daughter. His brother Shaykh Sayyid Isa (is the Imam of Masjid Hamzah in Atlanta) and mother also live in Atlanta.

References

External links

Madina Institute website 
Ihsanpath website 

1966 births
Living people
Date of birth missing (living people)
Syrian Sufis
American Sufis
Syrian emigrants to the United States
21st-century Muslim scholars of Islam
Syrian Muslim scholars of Islam
Scholars of Sufism
American imams
American Sunni Muslim scholars of Islam
Sunni imams
Shafi'is
People from Aleppo
People from Atlanta
Al-Azhar University alumni
University of Georgia faculty
Asharis